Notomenia is a genus of solenogasters, shell-less, worm-like, marinemollusks. In this genus the animal bears non-mineralized sclerites.  This genus is the sole representative of the family Notomeniidae, and has secondarily reduced its radula, which is vestigial.

References

Solenogastres